Tampere Cathedral (originally known as St. John's Church) is a Lutheran church in Tampere, Finland, and the seat of the Diocese of Tampere. The building was designed in the National Romantic style by Lars Sonck, and built between 1902 and 1907.

The cathedral is famous for its frescoes, painted by the symbolist Hugo Simberg between 1905 and 1906. The paintings aroused considerable adverse criticism in their time, featuring versions of Simberg's The Wounded Angel and The Garden of Death. Of particular controversy was Simberg's painting of a winged serpent on a red background in the highest point of the ceiling, which some contemporaries interpreted as a symbol of sin and corruption.

The altar-piece, representing the future resurrection of people of all races, was painted by Magnus Enckell.

References

External links 
  Tampere Cathedral

Buildings and structures in Tampere
Jussinkylä
Lutheran cathedrals in Finland
Lars Sonck buildings
National Romantic architecture in Finland
Art Nouveau church buildings in Finland
Churches completed in 1907
Tourist attractions in Tampere
20th-century churches in Finland
20th-century Lutheran churches